Wilhelmina Magdalene Stuart (1895–1985) was a notable New Zealand telegraphist. She was born in Dunedin, New Zealand in 1895.

References

1895 births
1985 deaths
People from Dunedin
Telegraphists